Michael H. Weber (born January 13, 1978) is an American screenwriter and producer. He and his writing partner, Scott Neustadter, are best known for writing the screenplay for the romantic comedy film 500 Days of Summer. The film is based on two real relationships Neustadter had. They also wrote the screenplays for the film adaptations of the novels The Spectacular Now, The Fault in Our Stars, and Paper Towns.

For writing The Disaster Artist, Neustadter and Weber were nominated for an Academy Award for Best Adapted Screenplay. They also created the sitcom Friends with Benefits, which lasted one season.

Early life
Weber grew up in a Jewish family in Great Neck, New York. He attended John L. Miller Great Neck North High School, and strongly identified with teen films as he was growing up, particularly those made by John Hughes and Cameron Crowe; he cites Ferris Bueller's Day Off and The Breakfast Club as two films he identified with in high school since he often skipped school and spent time in detention. He attended Syracuse University and graduated in 2000.

Career
Weber met his writing partner Scott Neustadter in 1999 at TriBeCa Productions when Neustadter hired Weber as his development intern. They started writing comedy together in their spare time, and soon after began writing a screenplay based on a failed relationship that Neustadter had experienced. They broke out as screenwriters in 2006, when they successfully sold their spec script, titled 500 Days of Summer, to Fox Searchlight Pictures. While 500 Days of Summer was still in pre-production, Sony Pictures Entertainment asked Weber and Neustadter to write The Pink Panther 2, the sequel to The Pink Panther (2006), which in turn was a reboot of the original Pink Panther franchise. They originally declined the job offer from Sony but ended up accepting it and writing the script after their managers stressed how "important [it was] to get a movie made". Both 500 Days of Summer and The Pink Panther 2 were released in 2009; although The Pink Panther 2 was panned by reviewers, 500 Days of Summer was well received by critics and audiences alike, and it was Fox Searchlight's highest grossing film of the year. The latter also received numerous awards and accolades, including an Independent Spirit Award for Best Screenplay and a Writers Guild of America Award nomination for Best Original Screenplay.

In 2009, Weber and Neustadter began developing a television sitcom for ABC called Friends with Benefits. The project was later moved to NBC and premiered in August 2011. Although it was the most successful of NBC's new comedy series for the 2010–11 season, it was cancelled after one season. They later adapted Tim Tharp's novel The Spectacular Now into a film of the same name, a romantic drama about high school students and alcoholism. They were commissioned to write the screenplay in 2009 by Fox Searchlight, who had produced their first script, 500 Days of Summer, but the film languished in pre-production for several years before it was picked up by director James Ponsoldt. The film was released in August 2013 to almost universally positive critical reviews. Weber and Neustadter's script was nominated for an Independent Spirit Award for Best Screenplay and the film won a National Board of Review award for Best Independent Film.

When Weber and Neustadter heard that 20th Century Fox had purchased the rights to adapt The Fault in Our Stars—a young adult novel written by John Green, about the romantic relationship between two teenagers with cancer—into a film, they campaigned the company's president to hire them to write the screenplay. Weber has said that they won the job by promising not to alter much from the book: "Hello! Please hire us! We want to bring absolutely nothing to the table!" The film, released in 2014, received positive reviews and performed well at the box office. They also adapted another Green book, Paper Towns, into a film of the same name.

Weber and Neustadter have also been hired to write Rosaline, a contemporary adaptation of Romeo and Juliet, as well as adaptations of the books Me Before You by Jojo Moyes (the film adaptation was ultimately released in 2016 without their involvement), and Rules of Civility by Amor Towles. They have also sold at least eight spec scripts since 500 Days of Summer; these include Starfish (bought by 20th Century Fox), Underage (bought by Montecito Pictures), and No Relation (bought by Fox Searchlight).

Weber and Neustadter wrote the script for The Disaster Artist (2017), the adaptation of the book of the same name. They also wrote Our Souls at Night, an adaptation of Kent Haruf's final novel of the same name, for Netflix, with Robert Redford and Jane Fonda playing the lead roles, the first movie they have made together since 1979's The Electric Horseman.

Weber and Neustadter will be also adapting another John Green book, Looking for Alaska. They also are adapting The Rosie Project, with Jennifer Lawrence formerly set to star.

In 2019, Weber joined other WGA writers in firing their agents as part of the WGA's stand against the ATA and the practice of packaging.

Personal life
Weber lives in the East Village of Manhattan, New York. He communicates with Neustadter, who lives in Los Angeles, by telephone and email.

Filmography

Films

(500) Days of Summer (2009)
The Pink Panther 2 (2009)
The Spectacular Now (2013) (also executive producer)
The Fault in Our Stars (2014)
Paper Towns (2015) (also executive producer)
The Disaster Artist (2017) (also executive producer)
Our Souls at Night (2017)
Rosaline (2022)
Rules of Civility (TBA)
The Rosie Project (TBA)

Television
Friends with Benefits (2011) (also executive producer)
Daisy Jones & The Six (2023) (also executive producer)

Awards

(500) Days of Summer
Critics' Choice Movie Awards for Best Screenplay (Nominated)
Utah Film Critics Association for Best Screenplay (Nominated)
Washington D.C. Area Film Critics Association for Best Screenplay (Nominated) 
Hollywood Film Festival Award for Breakthrough Screenwriter
Independent Spirit Award for Best Screenplay
Las Vegas Film Critics Society for Best Screenplay
Oklahoma Film Critics Circle for Best Screenplay - Original
Satellite Award for Best Original Screenplay
Southeastern Film Critics Association for Best Original Screenplay
St. Louis Gateway Film Critics Association for Best Screenplay
Writers Guild of America Award for Best Original Screenplay (Nominated)

The Spectacular Now
Alliance of Women Film Journalists for Best Adapted Screenplay (Nominated) 
Independent Spirit Awards for Best Screenplay (Nominated)
Indiana Film Critics Association for Best Screenplay (Nominated)
San Francisco Film Critics Circle for Best Adapted Screenplay (Nominated) 
St. Louis Gateway Film Critics Association for Best Adapted Screenplay (Nominated)
Washington D.C. Area Film Critics Association for Best Adapted Screenplay (Nominated)

The Disaster Artist
Academy Award for Best Adapted Screenplay (Nominated)
Writers Guild of America Award for Best Adapted Screenplay (Nominated)

References

External links

1978 births
Living people
American male screenwriters
Jewish American screenwriters
People from Great Neck, New York
People from the East Village, Manhattan
Syracuse University alumni
Writers from Manhattan
Great Neck North High School alumni
Screenwriters from New York (state)
21st-century American Jews